Green chips are stocks in a companies in "green" or environmentally friendly industries or that operate in a socially responsible manner.  It is a play on the term blue chip stocks with the word "green" representing eco investing or more broadly socially responsible investing.

Green chip companies can be involved in industries such as solar energy, wind energy, geothermal, plug-in hybrid electric vehicles (PHEV), organic foods, water, carbon trading, waste-to-energy, smart grid, hydrogen fuel cells, cannabis, regenerative farming, responsible banking, and psychedelic medicines.

History 
The term "green chip stocks", which refers to the publicly traded companies in the green market has been accredited to Jeff Siegel, who first used the term in 2004.

See also 
 Chip
 Blue chip
 Red chip
 P chip
 S chip
 Purple chip

References

External links
"Green Chip Stocks" – an investment blog

Stock market terminology